"Only Want You" is a song by British singer Rita Ora featured on her second studio album Phoenix (2018). A remixed version, featuring American singer 6lack, was released on 1 March 2019 as the fifth and final single from the album. The song initially charted in the UK in November 2018, following the release of the album. After being released as a single, the song reached a new peak of number sixty in 2019.

Background
Ora confirmed the song's release as a single in February 2019, through Twitter, saying the song would be released in a version featuring a "special guest", later revealed to be American singer 6lack.

In an interview, Ora said "Only Want You" was one of her favourite tracks on Phoenix, calling it "really intense" with "that incredible Nirvana guitar. I think those elements were super important for me to bring into this album. And at the same time, it has a killer beat." Idolator wrote that the track seemed like an obvious choice for the next single, saying that it was "singled out in reviews and became an instant fan favorite".

Charts

Certifications

References

External links
 
 

2018 songs
2019 singles
Rita Ora songs
Songs written by Ali Tamposi
Songs written by Louis Bell
Songs written by Emily Warren
Songs written by Andrew Watt (record producer)
Song recordings produced by Louis Bell